Public consultation (Commonwealth countries and European Union), public comment (US),  or simply consultation, is a regulatory process by which the public's input on matters affecting them is sought. Its main goals are in improving the efficiency, transparency and public involvement in large-scale projects or laws and policies. It usually involves notification (to publicise the matter to be consulted on), consultation (a two-way flow of information and opinion exchange) as well as participation (involving interest groups in the drafting of policy or legislation). A frequently used tool for understanding different levels of community participation in consultation is known as Arnstein's ladder, although some academics contest that Arnstein's ladder is contextually specific and was not intended to be a universal tool. Ineffective consultations are considered to be cosmetic consultations that were done due to obligation or show and not true participatory decision making.

Public comment (or "vox populi") is a public meeting of government bodies which set aside time for public comments, usually upon documents. Such documents may either be reports such as Draft Environmental Impact Reports (DEIRs) or new regulations. There is typically a notice which is posted on the web and mailed to lists of interested parties known to the government agencies. If there is to be a change of regulations, there will be a formal notice of proposed rulemaking.

The basis for public comment is found in general political theory of constitutional democracy as originated during and after the Enlightenment, particularly by Rousseau. This basis was elaborated in the American Revolution, and various thinkers such as Benjamin Franklin, Thomas Jefferson and Thomas Paine are associated with the rejection of tyrannical, closed government decision making in favor of open government. The tradition of the New England Town Hall is believed to be rooted in this early American movement, and the distillation of formal public comment in official proceedings in the United States is a direct application of this format in the workings of public administration itself.

Consultations around the world 
Public consultations are typically held in Commonwealth countries such as the United Kingdom, Canada, New Zealand or Australia, though most democratic countries have similar systems. In the United States, for example, this process is called "public notice and comment" (see Rulemaking). Some organisations such as the OECD also use such processes. In Canada, the word "consultation" has a special meaning among some First Nations Groups: "it is the duty of the Crown and third parties to consult with First Nations who have asserted, but not proved, aboriginal rights or title."

There is great variation of public consultations. In some countries there is a list of all consultations, or consultations are mentioned in normal news feed. Depending on the country there can be national or regional public consultations.

The Hungarian Fidesz government has employed so-called National Consultations, sending questionnaires to citizens that survey their opinions on government policy and legislation while pushing the Fidesz governments' ideology and agenda with suggestive questions (e.g. by referring to a supposed "Soros plan" to "convince Brussels to resettle at least one million immigrants from Africa and the Middle East annually on the territory of the European Union, including Hungary", that this "is part of the Soros plan to launch political attacks on countries objecting to immigration and impose strict penalties on them", and asking citizens whether they agree, or blasting "Brussels bureaucrats" in a consultation about family policy). On other occasions, such as just prior to elections, the government sent letters notifying citizens that it will reduce their gas payments by €38, or sent pensioners gift vouchers. The Fidesz government has also carried out taxpayer-funded "information campaigns", or "national messaging initiatives", that have denounced supposed enemies of Hungary with budgets of tens of millions of euros per year.

Decisions which are made, revised or confirmed as a result of a consultation process are often referred to as the "consultation outcome", for example the Charity Commission for England and Wales consulted charities about the questions that many charities need to complete as part of their annual return and made "a number of changes and improvements" as a result, describing the amended return as the "consultation outcome", and UNESCO and the UN Office of the High Commission on Human Rights likewise described the results of their consultation process on ways to strengthen the UN Plan of Action on the Safety of Journalists as the "consultation outcome".

The two types of public comment

Public comment embedded in actual meetings is typical of meetings convened by legislative or executive bodies; judicial units do not have public comment, but rather testimony from witnesses and procedural statements from attorneys. Public units such as city councils or county legislative bodies are typical examples of legislative public comment hearing bodies. Note that comments may be written, oral, or electronic.

There are two types of comment periods. One is when comment goes to a specific agenda item. Secondly there is a class of public comment which pertains to items which are not on the agenda for that day. However, it is necessary that comments be restricted to matters within the jurisdiction of the government body.

This latter requirement is seldom enforced except in those unusual cases in which commentators have set themselves at odds with policy makers and have been designated as a nuisance. In such cases, there are usually more explicit reasons given for restricting the rights of such speakers, however most undesirable comments tend to be outside the scope of legislative jurisdiction. The above distinction between agenda-item public comment and what is called "general public comment" pertains both to legislative type bodies as well as executive agencies. These are typically commissions, committees or boards. There are typically public comment periods during meetings of agencies such as city councils, county boards, and agencies which are concerned with matters such as water quality, fish and game, sewer runoff management and transportation. Time limits frequently range from one to five minutes for unscheduled presentations. It is not typical to require that the person commenting be a resident, a registered voter, a qualified elector, or even a citizen, simply that they be present and able to speak.

A whole different class of public comment is requested by agencies which are seeking input on draft policy documents such as environmental impact reports which provide information which may be used in policy determinations by their own agency and other agencies at various levels of government. Typically there is a notice of completion of the draft which is posted in the newspaper, on the web, and is mailed to known interested parties who may be designated as "stakeholders" or simply "interested parties". A public comment period is established and comments which are received by the cutoff date become part of the official public record. In some cases, there is a statutory mandate that those comments be replied to or incorporated in some fashion into the Final document.

Oral public comment at public meetings

Comments provided at public meetings may be oral or written and not infrequently utilize audio visual aids such as thumbdrives, CD's or overhead projectors (transparencies or opaque material). They may include video clips. A laser pointer, such as used by professional presenters, is useful but seldom utilized except by scheduled presenters on preset agendas, who are often credentialed professionals hired by the government agency to produce reports or provide consultation.

Public comment in some cases includes remarks from experts or public officials with some role in the issue at stake, but at a different time or level of process. Typically these kinds of comments may be ad hoc, not solicited by the governing agency which is conducting the hearing. There may be informal expectation that such a party may comment, but if it is an interested agency then there will be prior notification and a larger chunk of time may be allowed to such presenters. Surprisingly, however, these knowledgeable high level speakers, including office holders, often are limited to the same time constriction and queing requirements as all other public commentors. They simply wait in line, their name is called when their speaker slip happens to come to the top of the pile, and they are subject to being cut off after their two minutes or three minutes are up. This equalization between expert and lay commentator is an example of social leveling which occurs in democratic process and which is often harshly criticized by elitist theorists such as Machiavellians, fascists, communist technocrats and other conservative social thinkers.

Persons preparing public comment often think about and express the value of the constitutional protection and a certain level of gratitude for the opportunity to speak. Such expressions are considered good etiquette the first few times a speaker presents to a board, and it is also common to state one's background, credentials, or interest. Persons who speak frequently to a particular agency become better known and typically refrain from repeating such formalities to excess, and may go directly into their substantive testimony.

Variation of official attitude toward public meeting comment

In constitutional democracies which permit public comment, meeting facilitators can be relaxed, friendly and informal, allowing for errors on the part of public speakers such as exceeding allowable time. In some cases they are strict in enforcement of rules and may make somewhat hostile remarks to speakers. This attitude may be a result of prior episodes in which public commenters may have expressed accusations or hostility to seated officials. Frequently, such remarks result in warnings and may escalate to the point that the meeting chair may not recognize the public speaker and refuse to allow access to the microphone. Less frequently, speakers who are out of order are ordered to leave, escorted out of the building, or, rarely, placed under arrest for trespass or other charges. However, most government agencies in the United States are reluctant to resort to such measures, which may be viewed as restricting free speech protection of the US and various state constitutions. They may also result in litigation and in some cases do. For instance, Robert Norse filed suit against the City of Santa Cruz, California when he made a Nazi-style straight arm salute to the Santa Cruz City Council as a protest for council not permitting one additional public speaker who had not put in a speaker's slip and would have exceeded the amount of time allowed for public comment. The suit, typical of a possible consequence of not permitting public comment, is based upon Title 42 Section 1983 of the US Code, and alleges that city council violated his First Amendment right to free speech by having him arrested for refusing to leave as ordered in response to his gesture.

Some states and regions may differ widely in their policies and procedures with regard to public comment, ranging from the extremes of anarchist collectives in twentieth century Spain, in which many routine decisions were made by workers' councils, to dictatorships in which making a comment on the performance of government officials can be proscribed by law as tantamount to slander or provoking insurrection. In such systems, even the very idea of exposure to risk of prosecution deters the flow of information needed for the system's self rationalization process, resulting in stifled innovation, accumulated inefficiencies, decline of group morale and trust levels, with  eventual system collapse.

Liberalized systems also typically proscribe slander, fabrications and personal attacks, however defined, and public commenters are discouraged from engaging in back and forth discussion with board or committee members. Comments which are directed from the floor towards persons who have the floor are generally classified as heckling.

Public comment in authoritarian systems
Authoritarian systems generally tend to take a dim view of public comment. In the writings of Benito Mussolini, he expressed the view that fascism offers "free" speech, but only to persons who were "qualified" to have an opinion. Similarly, in the historical development of Nazism, public commentators at official NSDAP rallies were not infrequently beaten by the mob, or, if there were large numbers supporting the adverse commentator, brawls broke out. today's People's Republic of China, public comment on government policy is considered inappropriate, and may result in long prison terms for persons such as Wei Jingsheng.

Public comment as an aid to editing of government publications
As indicated above, there is a separate and distinct form of public comment, in the US, does not occur at meetings but is solicited in written or electronic form prior to a set deadline. This type of comment may pertain to an intended action, such as permit issuance, or the classification of a particular species of plant or animal as endangered. Other instances occur with regard to publication of draft environmental impact reports, which comments are then answered and may be reflected in subsequent revisions to the document. These public comments are often posted on the web in advance of the deadline, which provides commentators with an opportunity to view the remarks of others before committing themselves in writing.

This type of comment process may be mandated in legislation or in regulations enforcing statutes such as the National Environmental Policy Act (NEPA) or the California Environmental Quality Act (CEQA). Triggering events may include development proposals, mandated master plan updates or discovery of an endangered species. The National Institutes of Health requested and received a large volume of public comment pertaining to its own openness, an analysis of which is posted on their website.

A government portal which may be useful allows review of comments and opportunity for making comment and can be searched by keyword.
The keyword search crosses different government agencies and has drop-downs permitting a boolean exclusion algorithm narrowing the focus between alternative choices such as documents, rules, notice of proposed rule changes, etcetera.

See also

 Participation (decision making)
 Stakeholder theory
 Notice of proposed rulemaking in the United States context
 Constitution
 Constitutional democracy
 Freedom
 Freedom of speech
 Freedom of speech by country
 Heckler's veto
 List of public policy topics by country
 Political correctness
 Symbolic speech
 Mandate (politics)
 Public policy

References

External links 

Australian consultations
 Australian Government, Public Consultations
New South Wales, Public consultations 
Queensland Government, Comment on

 
Public policy
Polling